George Henry Doucett (May 16, 1897 – May 1, 1974) was a Canadian politician. He was a Progressive Conservative member of the Legislative Assembly of Ontario from 1937 to 1957 and a member of the House of Commons of Canada from 1957 to 1965. He represented the provincial and federal ridings of Lanark in eastern Ontario. He was a member of cabinet in the provincial governments of George Drew, Thomas Kennedy and Leslie Frost. He has the distinction of being the last Canadian federal Member of Parliament to be acclaimed into office.

Background
Doucett was born in Ramsay Township located in Lanark County, Ontario, the son of Joseph Doucett and Martha Irwin, he was a farmer and insurance broker before entering politics. He was married to Mona Middleton in 1965 at the age of 68 while Mona was 60.

Politics
At the age of 21 he was elected as a township councillor of the Ramsay Council. In 1928, he was elected reeve and was elected Warden of Lanark County in 1935.

In 1937, he was elected to the Ontario Legislature representing the riding of Lanark. A member of the Progressive Conservative Party of Ontario, he was re-elected in 1943, 1945, 1948, 1951, and 1955. From 1943 to 1951, he was the Minister of Public Works and the Minister of Highways.

Upon the death of the federal Member of Parliament for Lanark, William Gourlay Blair, in 1957, Doucett  resigned from the Ontario Legislature and was acclaimed as a Member of Parliament in a 1957 by-election. He was re-elected in 1958, 1962, and 1963. He did not run in 1965.

Cabinet posts

References

External links
 
 

1897 births
1974 deaths
Progressive Conservative Party of Ontario MPPs
Members of the House of Commons of Canada from Ontario
Progressive Conservative Party of Canada MPs
Mayors of places in Ontario
Members of the Executive Council of Ontario